Legolas (pronounced ) is a fictional character in J. R. R. Tolkien's The Lord of the Rings. He is a Sindar Elf of the Woodland Realm and one of the nine members of the Fellowship who set out to destroy the One Ring. He and the Dwarf Gimli are close friends.

Commentators have noted that Legolas serves as a typical Elf in the story, demonstrating more-than-human abilities such as seeing further than anyone else in Rohan and sensing the memory of a long-lost Elvish civilisation in the stones of Hollin.

Fictional history 

Legolas was the son of Thranduil, King of the Woodland Realm of Northern Mirkwood, who appeared as "the Elvenking" in The Hobbit. Thranduil, one of the Sindar or "Grey Elves", ruled over the Silvan Elves or "Wood-elves" of Mirkwood.

Legolas is introduced at the Council of Elrond in Rivendell, where he came as a messenger from his father to discuss Gollum's escape from their guard. Legolas was chosen to be a member of the Fellowship of the Ring, charged with destroying the One Ring. He accompanied the other members in their travels from Rivendell to Amon Hen,  When the fellowship was trapped by a snowstorm while crossing the Misty Mountains, Legolas scouted ahead, running lightly over the snow, and told Aragorn and Boromir that the thick snow they were trying to push through was only a narrow wall. Back in the lowlands of Hollin, Legolas helped fend off an attack by Saruman's wargs. Gandalf then led the fellowship on a journey underground through Moria. In Moria, Legolas helped fight off Orcs and recognized "Durin's Bane" as a Balrog. After Gandalf's fall, Aragorn led the Fellowship to the Elven realm of Lothlórien. Legolas spoke to the Elf-sentries there on behalf of the Fellowship.

There was initially friction between Legolas and the Dwarf Gimli, because of the ancient quarrel between Elves and Dwarves, rekindled by Thranduil's treatment of Gimli's father Glóin. Legolas and Gimli became friends when Gimli greeted Galadriel respectfully. When the fellowship left Lothlórien, Galadriel gave the members gifts; Legolas received a longbow, which he used to bring down a Nazgûl's flying steed in the dark with one shot.

After Boromir's death and the capture of Merry Brandybuck and Pippin Took by orcs, Legolas, Aragorn, and Gimli set out across Rohan in pursuit of the two captured hobbits.  In the forest of Fangorn Legolas and his companions met Gandalf, resurrected as "Gandalf the White,"  who delivered a message to Legolas from Galadriel. Legolas interpreted this as foretelling the end of his stay in Middle-earth:

 "Legolas Greenleaf long under tree,
 In joy thou hast lived, Beware of the Sea!
 If thou hearest the cry of the gull on the shore, 
 Thy heart shall then rest in the forest no more."

The three met with the Riders of Rohan, fought in the Battle of Helm's Deep, and witnessed Saruman's downfall at Isengard, where they were reunited with Merry and Pippin.

Legolas and Gimli accompanied Aragorn and the Grey Company on the Paths of the Dead. After Aragorn summoned the Dead of Dunharrow to fight for him, Legolas saw them terrify the Corsairs of Umbar from their ships at Pelargir. Galadriel's prophecy was fulfilled: as Legolas heard the cries of seagulls, he experienced the Sea-longing — the desire to sail west to Valinor, the "Blessed Realm", latent among his people. He fought in the Battle of the Pelennor Fields and at the Black Gate, and watched as Sauron was defeated and Barad-dûr collapsed.

After the destruction of the One Ring, Legolas remained in Minas Tirith for Aragorn's coronation and marriage to Arwen. Later, Legolas and Gimli travelled together through Fangorn forest and to the Glittering Caves of Aglarond, as Legolas had promised Gimli. Eventually Legolas brought south many Silvan Elves, and they dwelt in Ithilien, and it became once again the "fairest country in all the westlands." They stayed in Ithilien for "a hundred years of Men." After Aragorn dies, Legolas built a small ship and sailed West, reportedly taking Gimli with him.

Concept and creation 

The name Legolas Greenleaf first appeared in "The Fall of Gondolin", one of the "Lost Tales", circa 1917. The character, who guides survivors of the sack of the city to safety, is mentioned only once.

The medievalists Stuart D. Lee and Elizabeth Solopova note that Legolas's lament over the stones of the Elvish land of Hollin: "Only I hear the stones lament them: deep they delved us, fair they wrought us, high they builded us; but they are gone," recalls the Old English poem The Ruin. 
The Tolkien critic Paul Kocher writes of the same passage that it shows how Elves such as Legolas have senses keener than mortal Men: he can see further and can even hear the stones lamenting the passing of the Elves. In Kocher's view, Legolas is an "emissary for the Elves", as Gimli is for the dwarves; he suggests that the point Tolkien was making was that Legolas was a typical young elf.

The Tolkien scholar Tom Shippey observes that Legolas, describing the great hall of Meduseld in the capital of Rohan, too far off for any but an Elf to make out clearly, speaks a line which is a direct translation of one from Beowulf: "The light of it shines far over the land", líxte se léoma ofer landa fela.

Adaptations 

Legolas was voiced by Anthony Daniels in Ralph Bakshi's 1978 animated version of The Lord of the Rings. In the film, he takes Glorfindel's place in the "Flight to the Ford"; he meets Aragorn and the hobbits on their way to Rivendell and sets Frodo on his horse before Frodo is chased by the Nazgûl to the ford of Bruinen.

Legolas was voiced by David Collings in the 1981 BBC Radio 4 adaptation. In the 1993 Finnish miniseries Hobitit he was portrayed by Ville Virtanen.

In Peter Jackson's Lord of the Rings movie trilogy (2001–2003), Legolas was portrayed by Orlando Bloom. He was presented as an unstoppable fighter, performing dramatic feats of battle. 

Bloom reprised his role as Legolas in Jackson's 2013 release The Hobbit: The Desolation of Smaug, and again for the 2014 follow-up The Hobbit: The Battle of the Five Armies. Legolas's role in the films is an addition, as he did not appear in the novel. He is attracted to the non-canon elf-woman Tauriel.

In the West End musical, The Lord of the Rings: The Musical, Legolas was portrayed by Michael Rouse. Legolas appeared as a playable character in Lego Dimensions as an expansion character, bundled with an arrow launcher.

References

Primary
This list identifies each item's location in Tolkien's writings.

Secondary

Grey Elves
Teleri
Fictional archers
The Lord of the Rings characters
Literary characters introduced in 1954
Adventure film characters

de:Figuren in Tolkiens Welt#Legolas